A whitewater river is any river where its gradient and/or flow create rapids or whitewater turbulence. This list only focuses on rivers which are suitable for whitewater sports such as canoeing, kayaking, and rafting.

Africa 
 Zambezi, Zambia
 Nile, Uganda
 Tana River, Kenya

Asia

Pakistan 
 Sutlej
 Braldu
 Swat
 Kunhar River
 Indus River

Thailand 
 Wa River is a popular whitewater rafting destination in the Nan Province of Thailand. It has rapids ranging from difficulty levels of 2 through 6.
 Wang Thong River is a popular whitewater rafting destination in the Phitsanulok Province of Thailand. It has rapids ranging from difficulty levels of 3 through 5.

India 
In the north, most rivers in India descend from the Himalayas, the highest mountains on earth: cold glacial waters thunder down the rocks, bringing with them ample whitewater rapids to encounter.  The water here is high volume and can be very violent in the early spring. Hence, extreme caution must be taken if one has not mastered paddling skills for rapids above class III. Caution should otherwise be exercised near the Tibetan border as this is area is a place of extreme political dispute, on land and on water.  
 Zanskar, a Grand Canyonesque experience. Class III-IV. Gradings, as on all rivers, subject to change depending on volume of water.
 Alaknanda
 Bhagirathi
 Brahmaputra River- This river begins in Tibet and winds its way towards Arunachal Pradesh, from whence it continues in a very steep gradient. Class V in high volume, but Class VI on some waterfalls that must be portaged. This area is a contested area between India and China and much paperwork is required to ride it.
 Mandakini
 Ganges: This river is thousands of miles long. It begins in the Himalayas and empties into the Bay of Bengal, shared with Bangladesh. Sadly, this river, very holy to Hindus, is very sick with pollution in its lower reaches, particularly near cities like Varanasi. This is a big water river that varies through the whole gamut depending on location, class II-V+ rapids. 
 Tons
 Kali
 Yamuna
 Teesta
 Rangit

South India 
Towards the south, all rivers originate from the Western Ghats. Most of them can only be paddled in the monsoon season (June–October), while some others can be paddled year-round as they are dependent on dam releases. Only a small percentage of the rivers have recorded descents, and there is a vast potential for first descents.

Rivers in Karnataka 
 Kali River, section near Dandeli. Class III-III+
 Cauvery, multiple sections, Bheemeshwari, Dubare, Hogenakkal Class II-II+
 Upper Barapole, in Coorg. Class III-IV. Very creekish river.
 Sitanadi, near Agumbe. Class III
 Kempuhole, near Sakleshpur. Class II-V.
 Bhadra, Class II-III
 Shishila, near Dharmasthala, Class II+

Indonesia 
 Alas River, located in South Aceh, Aceh, Sumatra.
 Asahan River, located in North Sumatra, Sumatra. Class IV-V.
 Batang Tarusan River, located in Taratak, West Sumatra, Sumatra. Class II-IV.
 Manau River, located in Jambi, Sumatra.
 Manna River, located in Tanjung Sakti, Lahat, South Sumatra, Sumatra. Grade IV.
 Selabung River, located in Banding Agung, South Ogan Komering Ulu, South Sumatra, Sumatra.
 Citarik River, located in Mount Halimun National Park, West Java, Java.
 Serayu River, located in Wonosobo, Dieng Highlands, Central Java, Java. Class II-IV.
 Ayung River, located in Bali.
 Nimanga River, located in Timbukar, Minahasa, North Sulawesi, Sulawesi.
 Sa’dan River, located in Tana Toraja, South Sulawesi, Sulawesi. Grade III-IV.

Malaysia 
 Padas, located in Sabah, Borneo. Class III-IV (during rainy season - class V).
 Kiulu, located in Sabah, Borneo. Class I-II
 (Kampar River @ Itik, located in Gopeng Perak,  Malaysia. Class I1-V)
 (Selangor River, located in Kuala Kubu bahru, Selangor. Class II-V)
 (Sungkai River, located in Sungkai, perak, Malaysia. Class I-V)
 (Ulu Slim River, located at Slim Village, Perak, Malaysia. Class I-V)
 (Bernam River, Located in Tanjung malim, Perak, Malaysia. Class I-III)
 (Loh River, located in Ulu Dungun, Terengganu, Malaysia. Class II-VI)
 (Singoh River, located in Grik, Perak, Malaysia. class II-VI)
 (Sedim River, located in Kulim Kedah, Malaysia. Class II-V)

Philippines 
 Cagayan (de Oro) River, located in Cagayan de Oro City, Misamis Oriental, Philippines. Class II-III (upper section - class IV). Whitewater tributaries include:
 Bubunaoan River, located in Cagayan de Oro City, Misamis Oriental and Bukidnon, Philippines. Class II-III
 Tumalaong River, located in Lingating, Baungon, Bukidnon, Philippines. Class II-III
 Kalawaig River, located in Talakag, Bukidnon, Philippines.
 Tagoloan River, located in Tagoloan, Misamis Oriental, Philippines. Class I-II (upper Tagoloan - Class II-IV)
 Malitbog River, located in Malitbog, Bukidnon, Philippines. Class II-III (creeking)
 Agusan River, located in Agusan, Cagayan de Oro city, Philippines. Class II-III (creeking)
 Jasaan (also known as Cabulig River) River, located in Jasaan, Misamis Oriental, Philippines. Class II in lower section, Class II-III in middle section.
 Cabulaway River, located at Balingasag, Misamis Oriental, Philippines. Class I-III (creeking)

Europe

United Kingdom 

Whitewater rivers in the UK are typically low volume and technical. In England and Wales rivers are typically less than 20 m3/s, and some are run with less than 1 m3/s (usually these involve skidding the kayak down steep rockslides and small waterfalls). In Scotland there are also a few bigger volume (up to about 50 m3/s) rivers. Like many places in Europe, England, Scotland and Wales have been subject to centuries of rivers getting dammed, weired, or diverted in ways that suit agriculture or land development and the natural flow has been altered heavily in many regions; there are many orphan dams or sites intended for grist mills that no longer have any function but obstruct the water.  Some areas of the island Great Britain occupies has enough gradient to create rapids and waterfalls, but unfortunately ages of damming  prevents the full volume of water and snowmelt from reaching the lower reaches: Clywedog Dam holds back approximately 50,0000 megalitres of water alone on the River Severn, and Parliament granted weirs and locks to be placed upon that river multiple times during the 19th century, some of which are still used.    Scotland is famous for its rocky north,  but many rivers have been dammed in Scotland over the course of the 20th century to create hydroelectric power, with the trend still continuing.

Almost all runs in England and Wales need recent rain to be at a paddleable level, and many can only be run immediately after heavy rain. In Scotland, some bigger rivers can be run for weeks after rain although as with the rest of the country, most need recent wet weather. The paddling season is year-round but the rivers are more often runnable in winter (the wettest months of the year being December and January). Exceptions to this include rivers which have artificially maintained flows from reservoirs. On these rivers, flow may increase in dry weather as more water is released. The Afon Tryweryn is one example in Wales.

Most runs offer only a few kilometres of whitewater; often several rivers can be run on a wet day. Some rivers consist of only a single rapid. Only a few rivers (such as the Findhorn and Spean in the Scottish Highlands) have more than a days' worth of paddling, and most of this tends to be grade III or less.

The River Dart excepted, there is no natural whitewater in the (mainly flat) south and east of England. Here whitewater paddlers often go playboating at man made weirs. Hurley weir on the River Thames west of London is probably the most popular. There are several artificial whitewater courses, where water is pumped or diverted through a concrete channel containing obstacles to create rapids. There is a 28 m3/s artificial whitewater course on the Trent at Holme Pierrepont in Nottingham (at the National Watersports Centre), a 5 m3/s course on the Tees in Teesside, and smaller courses on the Nene at Northampton, and at Cardington.

In England Commercial rafting is limited to artificial whitewater courses (where it often provides the majority of the courses' income). Bigger and more reliable rivers can be found in Scotland and Wales, in particular the River Findhorn, River Orchy, River Spey, River Tay and the Afon Tryweryn.

There are several sites off the west coast of Britain where strong tidal currents channeled between islands create big volume sections of whitewater. These include the Bitches in Pembrokeshire in Wales, and the Falls of Lora on the west coast of Scotland.

Legal access to whitewater is a big issue in England and Wales. The law is currently unclear, resulting in two schools of thought followed. 
 The first, followed by many anglers and the Anglers Association, states that rivers are almost all private and require access agreements to be set up with the riparian owners. This means that the public are only allowed access to a tiny proportion of the available whitewater, and often this is restricted to a few months or even a few days per year. This also limits commercial operations and the activities of clubs. Agreements rarely exist as there is no incentive for the owners of rivers to let anyone else use them.
 Recently, legal research conducted by Rev Dr Douglas Caffyn, claims to have identified a public right of access on all navigable rivers in England and Wales in Common Law. In law, a public right is a higher right than any private right, and so this outweighs the rights of the riparian owners in a court of law.

In Scotland, like most of the rest of the world, access to whitewater is legal and has never been illegal. It has been enshrined in law in the recent Scottish Land Reform act. The Right to Roam act in England explicitly excluded rivers. The British Canoe Union is running the Rivers Access Campaign to raise awareness and bring about changes in the law to permit public access to all inland rivers in England and Wales.

Alps 

Whitewater rivers in the Alps are mainly medium volume glacier-fed rivers with long continuous rapids and few big drops. The season is short (two or three months in early summer when the snow and glaciers are melting) but the whitewater is reliable in this period. Tourists come from around Europe to kayak and raft–the most common centres are Briançon in the French Alps, the area around Landeck in Austria, and Bovec in Slovenia.

Austria 
 Enns River, Schladming, Class 3-4
 Inn River Imst Gorge, Haiming, Class 3
 Inn River Landeck Gorge, Landeck, Class 4-5
 Saalach River, Lofer, Class 3-4
 Salzach River, Zell am See, Class 3-4
 Sanna River, Landeck, Class 4

France 
 Dranse River, Morzine, Class 3-4
 Doron de Bozel River, Bourg St Maurice, Class 4-5
 Durance River, Embrun, Class 3
 Guisane River, Briancon, Class 3-4
 Isere River, Bourg St Maurice, Class 4
 Ubaye River, Barcelonnette, Class 4-5

Italy 
 Dora Baltea River, Villeneuve, Class 3-4
 Noce River, Dimaro, Class 4-5
 Sesia River, Varallo Sesia, Class 2-4

Slovenia 
 Soca River, Bovec, Class 3-4

France (Corsica) 

For a brief three to six week period in March and April snowmelt runoff explodes down the steep gorges creating the ultimate destination for any rafter or kayaker. While the Corsican whitewater season is short, the rocky island offers exciting whitewater in rivers such as Golo and Tavignano.

 Golo River, Ponte Leccia, Class 3-4

Greece 

The best time to go rafting and kayaking in Greece is in Spring when the river flow and weather are ideal.

 Arachthos River, Arta, Class 2-4
 Kalaritikos River, Arta, Class 4
 Mileopotamos River, Grevena, Class 3-4
 Venetikos River, Grevena, Class 2-4
 Pinios River - Vernezi Route, Larissa, Class 3-4
 Aspropotamos River, Trikala, Class 3

Italy (Apennines) 

Spring is the best time for rafting and kayaking in Southern Italy as the currents are stronger.

 Lao River, Laino Borgo, Class 3-4

Montenegro
Rivers in Montenegro all come from high mountains close to the sea. They have natural riverbeds with very different sections from steep creeking to large volume. They have best water in spring, but some are runnable throughout the year.

Tara river, Kolašin, Mojkovac, Žabljak, Pljevlja, Plužine 130 km, Durmitor National Park Class 2-5

Moraca river, Kolašin, Podgorica, Class 2-5

Lim river, Plav, Andrijevica, Berane, Bijelo polje, Class 2-4

Cijevna, Podgorica, Class 3

Norway 

Similar to its Swedish neighbour, Norwegian whitewater rivers are typically steep pool-drop rivers with many waterfalls, and are run mainly by experienced kayakers. There are also bigger (sometimes glacier-fed) rivers which are sometimes rafted. The season lasts all summer, although some rivers only run after recent rain. Norwegian waterfalls regularly feature on extreme kayaking videos.

Portugal 

The best time for whitewater in Portugal is in Spring during the higher river flow.

 Paiva River - Praia do Vau to Espiunca, Arouca, Class 3-4 
 Laboreiro River I - (Castro Laboreiro) Ameijoeira Bridge to Ribeiro de Baixo, class IV-V (X);
 Laboreiro River II - (Castro Laboreiro) Ribeiro de Baixo to Olelas, Class IV-V (X);
 Vez River I - Porta Cova (Sistelo) to Sistelo Bridge, Classe IV (V);

Russia 

White water sport in Russia is quite popular, but the vast majority of people uses catamarans for these purposes. 
The best period for whitewater is May and July–August. Some rivers are possible to raft in June and September.

Here is a list of the most popular rivers:

Altai 

 Peschanaya river - Class III
 Katun river - Class IV. One of the most volumed river in the region.
 Kumir, Korgon, Charysh rivers - Class IV. Normally, the trips include rafting down all three rivers.
 Chuya river - Class V (VI for Mazhoiskiy kaskad). The right tributary of Katun river. There are regular competitions down Chuya on the Mazhoyskiy kaskad part - the canyon part of the river, which includes around 30 rapids, 10 of them are VI class.
 Bolshaya Sumulta, Malaya Sumulta rivers - Class V. Malaya Sumulta flows into Bolshaya Sumulta which is the tributary of Katun.
 Shavla river - Class V. Tributary of Argut.
 Chulyshman river - Class V (VI). The middle and down part contain three rapids V class and two VI class. The upper part contains seven VI class rapids. There is an opportunity of rafting down upper Bashkaus and middle-down Chulyshman (Class V).
 Bashkaus river - Class V (VI). The upper part has a number of IV class rapids and one V class. The down part is one of the most difficult places for white water containing 11 rapids VI class. The river flows in 35 km canyon without any opportunity of evacuation by land. 
 Argut river - Class VI
 Kadrin river - Class VI

Baikalia 

 Zun-Murin river - Class III
 Utulik river - Class IV (V)
 Khara-Murin river - Class IV (V)
 Snezhnaya river - Class IV (V)

Caucasus 

 Bolshoy Zelenchuk river - Class II (IV)
 Kuban river - Class II (IV)
 Bolshaya Laba river - Class II (V)
 Belaya river - Class II (VI)
 Mzymta river - Class II (V)
 Psheha river - Class III

Karelia 

 Tohmajoki river - Class II (IV)
 Uksunjoki river - Class II (V)

Kola Peninsula 

 Krasnenkaya river - Class III (IV)
 Kutsayoki river - Class III (IV)
 Tuntsayoki river - Class III
 Tumcha river - Class III

Novgorod Oblast 

 Msta river - Class I (II)

Putorana Plateau 

 Bolshoy Honnamakit river - Class III (IV)
 Ayan river - Class III
 Kureyka river - Class IV
 Oran river - Class VI

Sayan 

 Bolshoy Yenisei (Biy-Hem) river - Class IV
 Ulug-O river - Class IV
 , Abakan rivers - Class IV
 Oka river - Class IV
 Zhombolok river - Class IV (V). Tributary of Oka.
 Chuna (Uda) river - Class IV (VI)
 Kitoy river - Class V (VI)
 Onot river - Class VI

Transbaikalia 

 Vitim river - Class III
 Tsipa river - Class III (IV)

Ural 

 Inzer (Bolshoi Inzer) river - Class II (III)
 Lemeza river - Class II (III)
 Kara river - Class IV. The river flows in Polar Ural. Usually, the trips also include Sibirchata-Yaha river.

Serbia 

 Ibar river is one of the most famous whitewater courses in this area. Section between Usce and Maglic is class III. Upper Ibar is in class III-IV. 
Studenica river (left tributary of Ibar) is very attractive for whitewater kayaking (III-V) 
 Lim river in canyon between Kumanica and Prijepolje, class III-IV. Lim is also very attractive near town Priboj. 
 Veliki Rzav river class II-II+. It is one of the cleanest rivers in Serbia.

Bosnia and Herzegovina 

 Neretva river class 3
 Una river class 3-4
 Vrbas river class 3+
 Krivaja (Bosna) class 3-4
 Sutjeska river class 3-4

Bulgaria 

 Struma river class 3-4
 Arda river class 2-3

Romania 
 Cerna river class 2-4
 Jiu river class 2-3 (lower section), class 3-3+ (upper section - Jiu canion)
 Buzau river class 2-3
 Nera river class 2+
 Basca Roziliei river class 3-3+
 Basca Mare river class 3-4

Croatia 
 Mreznica river class 2-3

Spain 

Like the Alps, whitewater in the Pyrenees is best in early summer when the snow and glaciers are melting.

 Ara River - Torla, Class 3-5
 Gallego River - Murillo de Gallego, Class 3-4
 Esera River - Campo (Huesca), Class 3-4
 Noguera Pallaresa River - Llavorsi to Rialp, Sort, Class 3-4

Sweden 
The Swedish whitewater rivers are mainly big water and is located in the middle and north parts of Sweden. One of the most spectacular rivers is Vindelaelven and particularly Trollforsarna III-VI, where one Euro cup competition was held in 2007.

The main information channel for Swedish white water is Forsguiden,

North America

Canada 

Canada has a varied terrain that supports many kinds of environments, with the majority of whitewater found in three areas: the mountainous Rockies in Alberta, the smaller Eastern forests of Quebec, Ontario, and some of the Maritimes, and the volcanic influenced geology of British Columbia. This creates the conditions necessary for whitewater: gradient, volume, and pressure. Like its neighbor to the south, First Nations had used the river systems as personal highways and built dugout canoes to run rapids; later French Canadian fur trappers used the same technique to collect beaver pelts and form small settlements.

Canadian whitewater rivers are characterized by the dramatic difference between the high water spring run-off and the summer low water volume; the classification of rapids therefore changes from spring to summer. It also is highly subject to the change of seasons, where many places are frozen solid by October and, for example, runs that are ready in late May in the neighboring US Pacific Northwest are still too dangerous to attempt in British Columbia or too cold: the spring run-off of the glaciers has either not finished or the landscape is not fully thawed.

Most of the land in Canada is not privately owned and likewise neither are the rivers. Many places in which water thunders through the terrain are on land that is either protected or very remote, so knowledge of first aid and the local wildlife is paramount. As with the United States to the South, rattlesnakes, grizzly bears, black bears, mountain lions, wolves, and two members of the lynx family are very much active at the height of rafting and kayaking season, and they do use the water as a source of food and sustenance.  On multi day excursions in The Northwest Territories, British Columbia, or Alberta it is extremely important to know or learn to coexist with the grizzly bears that live there; this is particularly true when it is salmon season. Caution should be used whenever camping in bear country, and learning how to properly store food or anything with a scent is paramount to avoiding conflict.

Alberta 

 Bow River - Horseshoe Canyon, II - III
 Carbondale Creek, Southern Alberta
 Cascade Creek, Western Rockies, III - IV
 Castle River, Southern Albert
 Elbow River, Western Rockies, III+ - IV
 Highwood River, and tributaries, Southern Alberta
 Kakwa River, Northern Alberta
 Kananaskis River, Foothills, II - III
 Mosquito Creek - Western Rockies, II - III
 Mystia River, Western Rockies, II - III+
 North Saskatchewan River, Rockies to Plains, II - III
 Oldman River, Southern Alberta
 Pipestone River, Western Rockies, III - IV
 Red Earth Creek, Western Rockies, IV - V
 St. Mary River (Montana-Alberta), II - III
 Sheep River, Western Rockies, III+ - V
 Slave River, NWT Border, I-VI
 Smoky River, Northern Alberta
 Upper Bow - Western Rockies, Willys Rapid Section, III - IV
 Upper Red Deer River, Alberta foothills, II - III
 Waterton River, Southern Alberta

British Columbia 

 Fraser River, British Columbia
 Alsek, British Columbia - Alaska
 Ashnola River, Keremeos, IV - IV+ 
 Babine River
 Capilano River
 Chehalis River
 Chilliwack River
 Coquitlam River
 Mamquam River
 Cheakamus River
 Dipper Creek, Squamish Valley, V+
 Kicking Horse River, III - IV
 Yoho River, Columbia Valley, IV - V
 Toby Creek, Columbia Valley, IV - V+
 Skookumchuck Creek, Columbia Valley, IV
 Upper Fraiser, Columbia Valley, III - IV
 Palliser River, Kootney Valley, III
 Albertson River, Kootney Valley, III - V
 Kootney River, Kootney Valley
 Thompson River, Central, III - IV-
 Stein River, Central, IV - V
 Nahatlatch River, Central, III - V
 Clear Water River, Central, III - IV
 Tatlow Creek, Coastal
 Ryan Creek, Coastal
 Soo River, Coastal, IV - V
 Callahan Creek, Coastal, V
 Kanu River, Coastal
 Homathko River, Coastal
 Dean River, Coastal
 Stikine River, Coastal, V - VI
 Englishman River, Island, III - IV
 Similkameen River, Princeton, II - III

Ontario 
 Niagara River  The Canadian side of the river has the largest of the three set of waterfalls that make up Niagara Falls, all rated Class VI.  Niagara Gorge squeezes a large volume that rivals the Congo River in size of the water in spite of being smaller in area. Many people have died from not respecting the water here, which is why one is very likely to get arrested for even attempting it.
 Albany River
 Gull River- Class III
 Ottawa River (at the Ottawa River Provincial Park near Whitewater Region, Ontario) III - IV
 Kesagami River
 Madawaska River-Class  III
 Magnetawan River
 Magpie River
 Missinaibi River
 Moose River
 Opeongo River
 Petawawa River-Class III - IV
 Spanish River
 Wellandvale/Twelve Mile Creek, in planning stage

Quebec 

 Coulonge River
 Bonaventure River
 Dumoine River
 Gens de Terre River
 Kipawa River
 Saint Lawrence River (Lachine Rapids), Montreal
 Moisie River
 Noire River
 Rouge River
 Rupert River
 Neilson River-Class  IV - V
 Du Nord River, III - VI
 Doncaster River, III - IV
 Jacques-Cartier River (Taureau), IV - V, Québec City
 Jacques-Cartier River (Tewkesbury), III - IV, Québec City
 Saint-Charles River, III, Québec City
 Broadback River, I - VI
 Gatineau River, III - IV
 Mistassibi River, IV - V, Lac saint-jean

Manitoba 

 Bloodvein River
 Manigotagan River
 Roseau River
 Seal River
 Whitemouth River

Northwest Territories 
The whitewater rivers in the Northwest Territories are remote and require access and egress by float plane or helicopter. Most are over or close to 300 km in length from the put in to the take out, and therefore are multi-day expeditions.

 North Nahanni River, Northwest Territories - IV-VI
 South Nahanni River, Northwest Territories - II, Upper III+
 Broken Skull River, Northwest Territories - II+
 Keele River, Northwest Territories - II+
 Natla River, Northwest Territories - II+ -III+
 Mountain River, Northwest Territories - II-III
 Ravensthroat River, Northwest Territories - II-III+
 Redstone River, Northwest Territories - II-III+
 Silverberry River, Northwest Territories - II-III+
 Horton River, Northwest Territories - I-III+
 Arctic Red River, Northwest Territories - I-III+
 Kazan River
 Slave River, Alberta Border, Fort Smith - I-V

United States 

The United States offers varied terrain and conditions through which rivers pass, everything from the deserts of the southwest to glacial peaks in Alaska to Appalachian creeks that thunder through the glades to even a few that run right through the downtown sections of small cities and isolated hamlets.

Legally, most rivers and creeks are not privately held. They are the property of the nation and its people and are overseen by individual state governments and a handful of federal government agencies in Washington, DC like the Department of the Interior, National Park Service, National Forest Service, and Bureau of Land Management. Dams may be held on a contract basis with the federal or state government, for example the energy company PG&E has dams in the Sierra Nevada range near Sacramento in California and this affects water volume. (Other entities like the Tennessee Valley Authority in the East have similar arrangements, and the water volume is lower than it should be naturally in the East in many sections of the Appalachians.)  The Army Corps of Engineers and the operators of the dams themselves usually schedule releases in advance and this information is readily available to the public upon request.

Many whitewater rivers and creeks exist in rather rural or wild conditions when compared to parts of Europe and thus are located in places where animals can bite back or harm visitors, including children and dogs. (Some require a substantial hike through forest, desert, or mountains to reach the put in and cannot be reached by car at all.) In no particular order or regard to specific geography, they would include grizzly bears, black bears, moose, bull elk,  porcupines, cougars, bobcats, more than 15 species of rattlesnakes on both sides of the Mississippi, scorpions, copperheads, water mocassins, and coral snakes. Beavers are sometimes extant on rivers but prefer to build in the calmer sections where there are only minor riffles and their dams are easily portaged or surmounted.

Eastern United States 

There are several places in the East where the water roars, everything from big rivers like the Delaware River to creeks that dive over large waterfalls, many exceeding . In fact, there used to be more of them but over time some of these have been dammed or altered; the upper portions of the Mississippi River near St. Paul Minnesota, for example, used to have very large rapids and several waterfalls. The Mississippi, the divide between East and West itself,  used to be a much more wild and turbulent river with more violent spots in its drainage area past Cairo Illinois with the Des Moines Rapids and the Sauk Rapids  being either larger than today or undammed.

New England 

The following are some of the rivers in New England that are popular.
 Ashuelot River, New Hampshire, Class III-IV
 Bearcamp River, New Hampshire, Class II-IV
 Contoocook River, New Hampshire, Class III-IV
 Dead River, Maine, Class III-V
 Deerfield River, Vermont and Massachusetts, Class II-V. Navigable from spring until just before Halloween, when the water begins to freeze. First rafting companies set up here in the 1980s.
 Farmington River, Massachusetts and Connecticut, Class III
 Gale River, New Hampshire, Class I-IV
 Housatonic River, Connecticut, Class I-V. Closest whitewater to New York City.  
 Kennebec River, Maine, mostly Class II-IV
 Millers River, Massachusetts, Class III 
 Penobscot River, Maine, Class III-V
 Quaboag River, Massachusetts, Class III
 Rapid River, Maine, Class IV
 Saco River, New Hampshire, Class III-IV
 Swift River, New Hampshire, Class II-IV
 West River, Vermont, class II-III
 Westfield River, Massachusetts, Class I-IV
 Winhall River, Vermont, Class III

New York 
 Black River, Watertown - Class III-V
 Delaware River - Class I-II. Further down the river also has a few rapids as well that can swell to III in wet weather.
 Esopus Creek - Class II-IV
 Genesee River - Class II-III
 Grasse River - Upper section, Class IV - V
 Hudson River, North Creek - Foreign visitors should be advised and warned that the name should not fool them: it is true that the Hudson empties in the tidal estuary where New York City sits. However, this section is over 200 miles away from New York City in heavily forested wilderness; this water is placid only in sections farther south and requires hiking to reach the put in in some cases; not to be attempted in the mistaken and dangerous belief the water is anything like it is near Manhattan. Class IV-V.  Suitable for kayakers intermediate and above.
 Middle Branch Oswegatchie River - Bryants Bridge and Sluice Falls sections, Class IV -V.
 Mongaup River - Class II-III; about 
 Moose River, Old Forge - Class IV-V+
 Niagara River (Whirlpool Rapids) - Class V+
 Raquette River - Class III - IV+
 Sacandaga River, Lake Luzerne- Class II-III
 Salmon River - Class I-III
 Ten Mile Creek - Class I-III; about

Mid-Atlantic 
 Lackawanna River, Pennsylvania,  Class I-IV: a  run
 Lehigh River, White Haven to Jim Thorpe, Pennsylvania - a  run, through a gorge, Class III; in high water this is a Class 4 run. A very good choice for those learning to paddle when the water is at its normal level.
 Nescopeck Creek, Pennsylvania, Class II-III
 Patapsco River,  Maryland, Class I-IV. A 31.5 mile (50.69 km) run
 Patuxent River, Maryland, Class I-IV.
Potomac River, West Virginia/Maryland/Virginia, Class II-V+. This river begins in the Appalachian Mountains and runs to the sea, a distance of 367 miles (approx 591 km.) This river forms the border between Northern Virginia and the District of Columbia. There are two major whitewater sections. The first is close to Harpers Ferry, West Virginia, class III. The second section is V to V+ and includes the Great Falls of the Potomac, just  from the center of Washington, D.C. Additionally, there are at least five major "forks" of the Potomac, with some reaching class III - IV (without waterfalls), mostly in West Virginia.
 Rockaway River, Boonton, New Jersey, Class IV
 Youghiogheny River, Pennsylvania/Maryland; Upper Yough (Sang Run to Friendsville, MD), Class 4–5; Lower Yough (Ohiopyle to Bruner's Run, PA), Class II-IV.

Southeast 

The Southeast is the section of the nation where the Appalachian Mountains have their highest peaks.  In most cases the size of the water is smaller than the West, however, some of the finest whitewater in the East is here, especially good for kayakers.

Chattahoochee River, Columbus, Georgia- Urban whitewater, class I-V rapids.  Short course of very turbulent rapids with unusually high water volume for a Southern river.
Chattooga River, Georgia / South Carolina - sports long, challenging rapids, big drops, and thunderous power; this river can be a challenge for even experts; the Chattooga was one of the rivers used for the filming of the 1973 adventure movie, Deliverance. It is designated as a Wild and Scenic River.
 Cheat River, West Virginia - Class IV.
 French Broad River, Asheville, North Carolina - featuring a long run of varying difficulty, from flatwater runnable in a canoe to class IV rapids near Hot Springs, North Carolina and the border with Tennessee. The main drawbacks are that the water tends to be muddy or polluted and it is a natural flow river.
 Gauley River, Summersville, West Virginia - Nicknamed "The Beast of the East." Has huge rapids, especially at the "Fall Drawdown" (when the reservoir is drained) is a world-class ride; many of them listed as Class V; the Upper Gauley, from Summersville to Mason's Branch, is the tougher section; the Lower Gauley, from Koontz' Flume to Swiss, is still a Class-IV river with significant hazards; navigating the Upper and Lower Gauley in a single day is called "the Gauley Marathon," twenty-six miles of big rapids and paddling.
 Green River, Asheville, North Carolina - the Green Narrows is the steepest "creek run" with regular activity in the Eastern U.S; with a gradient that reaches 600 feet/mile over one short section, The Narrows is a series of blind waterfalls and tight slots; regular, predictable releases from the Tuxedo Hydro Plant upstream draw paddlers on a regular basis.
 James River, Richmond, Virginia - Urban whitewater; Class IV.  Runs right through downtown Richmond, VA, the state capital.. Good for beginners in upper part and a decent river for practice for the more advanced. This river was named for James VI and I and was one of the first to ever be navigated by British settlers; much farther downriver the water becomes quieter and brackish and leads straight to the spot where the fort of Jamestown was built and the archaeological site still stands. Not far from Richmond, the Powhatan tribe built their capital, Werowocomoco,  on an island in this river and chose it in part because of its considerable rapids.  
 Linville Gorge, western North Carolina - This runs right through Pisgah National Forest and has Class V rapids; it is a creek run suitable for kayakers and small canoes but it is too small for rafts. Approximately 17 miles long and not recommended at all for novices as it is one of the most difficult runs in the east. Very steep gorge walls make escape in an accident impossible. Deaths have occurred for those who overestimate their skills. 
 Nantahala River, Bryson City, North Carolina - a relatively gentle river, with the final rapid having the propensity to send paddlers in for a cold, exhilarating swim; suitable for beginners and families with younger children.
 New River, Thurmond, West Virginia - Class III-V natural flow river. Passes through portions of Monongahela National Forest.
 Ocoee River, Ducktown, Tennessee – Site of 1996 Olympic Slalom Course at the Ocoee Whitewater Center and already a river with natural whitewater.  A very good river for both novices and more advanced paddlers. Gets its name from passiflora incarnata, the maypop, a very close relative of the commercial passionfruit  that is a common edible garden plant in the South and was introduced as a source of food to settlers by tribes like the Cherokee. This plant is still found in thickets near the river.
 Pigeon River (Tennessee – North Carolina), Tennessee - class III+ rapids, Dam released river with scheduled releases from Memorial Day to Labor Day. This river runs right through Cherokee National Forest and is not far from Great Smoky Mountains National Park.
 Watauga River, mostly cold and clear water Class I-II rapids with the exception of the Bee Cliff Rapids following scheduled high volume reservoir releases during summer months from the Tennessee Valley Authority Wilbur Dam flowing through Elizabethton, Tennessee (Northeast Tennessee); also upstream of both TVA Wilbur Dam and Watauga Dam as a separate, non-commercial run beginning in North Carolina to Johnson County, Tennessee above Watauga Lake; Class IV-V.

Western United States 

In the western United States, the more noted rivers, such as the Grand Canyon have much greater water volume and therefore require a different set of paddling skills. Western rafters also navigate many small, low volume rivers, some with much steeper descents than eastern rivers; however, since the mountains are newer in the west, the hazard from undercut rocks, a problem in the east, is replaced by more frequent log jams precipitated by logging activities near the rivers.

The big-water rivers usually do not require the precision paddling of smaller rivers, but have larger rapids and longer wilderness trips due to the greater length and water flow of the big rivers. The smaller rivers and creeks boated by most rafters offer many one- or two-day trips with difficulty levels from I to VI.

In the West, some paddlers start on the American in California and work their way up to the Rogue and Illinois in Oregon, the Tuolumne (California), the Salmon in Idaho, the Snake, and then the big-water rivers like the Green and Colorado through the Grand Canyon (Arizona), the Fraser in British Columbia, and many Alaskan streams.

California 

California has some of the most challenging whitewater runs in the United States as well as several rivers with sections that are safe for families with children who wish to go rafting. Several rivers in California are fed by the snowmelt of the Sierra Nevada mountain range as well as natural springs in high mountainous areas; some rivers flow directly through protected land and foreign visitors should be strongly warned that early spring runs can be very dangerous; the normal classification cranks up much higher turning some runs into death traps for even Olympic level whitewater enthusiasts. A primary example would be Cherry Creek, a class V-V+ river in normal conditions:  this creek has had a number of fatalities to its name for unwary kayakers because the water cuts through high vertical walls of granite: there is no way out except down the river and certain sections cannot be portaged. If the water volume gets too high, death is certain.

 American River
 Carson River
 Cosumnes River
 Eel River
 Feather River
 Kaweah River
 Kern River
 Kings River-  Cuts through a very deep canyon.  Overall class I-V rapids, depending on section as this river is quite large with many tributaries. Portions of the river are part of Kings Canyon National Park and also flow through Sierra National Forest which abuts the national park directly; the most challenging whitewater is normally not accessible except by hiking or horseback. Portions of the river and its tributaries were used for the 1972 Slalom Olympic Trials. Was designated a National Wild and Scenic River in 1987.
North Fork Kings River, class V.
South Fork Kings River, including Garlic Falls, Class V.  
Middle Fork Kings River III-V+
Dinkey Creek-Class V.
 Merced River
 Klamath River
 Mokelumne River
 Napa River
 Russian River
 Sacramento River-This river is one of the most important  rivers of Northern California. It begins in the Klamath Mountains and cuts right through downtown Sacramento, the state capital of California. It then turns west where it empties out near Oakland, a distance of over 400 miles. Although it has several sections that are heavily dammed for agriculture nearer the San Joaquin River Delta,  others like the Upper Sacramento near Mount Shasta range class II-IV.  
 Smith River
 Stanislaus River
 Trinity River
 Truckee River
 Tuolumne River This river partially enters Yosemite National Park and once played a role in the now-gone Hetch Hetchy Valley.  Its classification is I-V+. One section was not considered navigable until as late as 1983, and requires multiple portages of waterfalls that are too dangerous for kayakers in particular. This river requires overall that a rafter or kayaker knows how to swim, and many sections are in areas that are remote. 
Cherry Creek Class V-VI. For advanced kayakers and canoes only. 
 Clavey River, Class V+.  Clavey can only be accessed by hiking to the put in, and it is a wild 20.8 mile ride.

Colorado and Utah 

 Animas River
 Arkansas River - a big river, with many sections ranging from Class I to V, popular with kayakers and with commercial rafting companies. Numerous runs of all difficulty. Probably the most frequently run and one of the best rivers in Colorado.
 Boulder Creek
 Cache La Poudre River - Colorado's only federally designated Wild and Scenic River contains sections appropriate for every level of expertise including an easy Class II section, several Class III and Class-IV sections, as well as some Class V. There is a Class VI waterfall that is very dangerous because the last drop is unrunnable. The water pours off a slab into a -wide crack and grinds anything that goes into it.
 Clear Creek (Colorado)
 Colorado River-This river is the most famous whitewater river in the country, with sections in  Arizona, Nevada (near Hoover Dam), and Colorado; it is also one of the longest rivers in the Western deserts and its overall classification ranges from I-V+.  Gore Canyon is the first difficult section and should not be attempted by novices, Class IV-V, depending on the time of year and rainfall and this part is the upper section in Colorado. The section through the Grand Canyon and Grand Canyon National Park would include the Hance Rapids and overall the class of the rapids here are I-V, with the overall section being a IV.  Cataract Canyon is third,  with up to 1,400 m3/s volume running through the canyon as this section goes through Canyonlands National Park.  Class III to V.  Glen Canyon Dam is reliant on the releases from the dam that come seasonally, however this part  can get up to V+. Trips down this river can take many days to complete, and full navigation, months.
 Dolores River
 Green River
 Gunnison River: Grand Canyon National Park has a much lesser known sister to the northeast in Colorado: Black Canyon of the Gunnison National Park, created in 1999 and thus as of 2021one of the youngest of all national parks.  The Gunnison River drops about 34 feet per mile (10.4 m/1.6 km) in the canyon and thus has a steeper gradient than the portions of the Colorado that are normally rafted or kayaked. Rapids vary to class I to VI overall on the whole river and in the canyon itself the rapids get to V and up. Visitors must be highly skilled to raft the whole of the Black Canyon section.
Kannah Creek Class V
 Los Pinos River
 North Platte River
 Roaring Fork River
 South Platte River
 Yampa River

Idaho 

 Kootenai River
 Lochsa River
 Middle Fork Salmon River - Class III-IV
 North Fork Payette River
 Salmon River main stem - Class III-IV
 Snake River
 Payette River main stem

Illinois 

 Vermillion River

Minnesota 

 Baptism River
 Devil Track River
 Kettle River Class III-IV at Banning State Park
 Lester River
 Saint Louis River
 St. Croix River (Wisconsin–Minnesota) at Interstate State Park
 Temperance River

Montana 

 Clarks Fork Yellowstone River
 Gallatin River
 Madison River
 Stillwater River
 Boulder River
 Yellowstone River
 Middle Fork of the Flathead
 Big Timber Creek
 Sun River

Oregon 

River flow information is available from the USGS and Pat Welch River gauges
River forecast data available through National Weather Service
Popular whitewater rivers in Oregon:
 Alsea River, Upper North Fork (Class 3 (5))
 Blue River (Oregon), (Class 4 (5))
 Breitenbush River (Class 4)
 Bull Run River - Site of slalom course
 Calapooia River, the upper upper section (Class 3 (4))
 Clackamas River - Year-round water, proximity to Portland, and a range of runs make this a popular river.
 Barton to Carver (Class 2)
 Carver to Clackamette (Class 2)
 Bob's to Memaloose (Class 2)
 Fish Creek to Bob's (Class 3–4) - runnable year round (in kayaks, canoes, and rafts)
 Three Lynx to Fish Creek (Class 3–4) - runnable winter through late Spring most years.
 Killer Fang (Class 4)
 June Creek (Class 4)
 Collawash River
 Middle (Class 3+ to 4)
 Upper section (Class 4+ to 5-)
 Coquille River
 Black Rock Fork of the South Fork (Class 4 (5))
 Brewster Canyon, East Fork Coquille (Class 5)
 Lower (Class 3–4)
 South Fork (Coal Creek Canyon) (Class 4 (5))
 Upper South Fork (The Gem) (Class 5)
 Upper Upper South Fork (Cataract Canyon) (Class 5+ to 6)
 Crooked River (Class 4)
 Deschutes River
 Canyon Run (class 4 (5))
 Lower Deschutes (Class 3) 
 Riverhouse Run (Class 4)
 Dillon Falls to Meadow Camp (Class 4 (5))
 Upper Upper - Benham Falls (Class 5)
 Grande Ronde River
 Hood River
 Upper Middle Fork (Class 4-4+)
 Upper East Fork (Class 4+)
 Illinois River (Class 4+ - 5)
 John Day River
 Little River upper section (Class 4 (5))
 McKenzie River headwaters (Class 4–5)
 Middle Santiam River concussion run (Class 4)
 Molalla River
 Table Rock Fork (Class 3 (4))
 Three Bears (Class 3 (4))
 North Fork (Class 4+)
 Table Rock Fork Gorge (Class 4 - 5)
 Nehalem River
 North Fork Middle Fork Willamette River
 Miracle Mile (Class 5)
 Headwaters (Class 5)
 Lower Gorge (Class 4)
 North Santiam River
 Niagara section (Class 3, 4, 5)
 Little North Santiam River
 Opal Creek headwaters (Class 4 - 5)
 Upper Opal Creek (Class 4+)
 Lower Opal Creek (Class 4 (5))
 Opal Gorge (Class 4 - 5)
 Owyhee River
 Lower Canyon (Class 3)
 Upper Canyon (Class 4 (5))
 Roaring River (Clackamas River) (Class 4+ - 5)
 Rogue River This river was one of about four that was selected for filming The River Wild. A good challenge for intermediate kayakers.  Excellent fishing location and source is located close to Crater Lake. 
 Middle Fork Gorge (Class 4+ - 5)
 North Fork, Natural Bridge Section (Class 4 (6))
 North Fork, Mill Creek Section: (Class 4+)
 North Fork, Takilma Gorge (Class 4+)
 Salmon River (Class 5-5+)
 Salmonberry River (Class 3+ (5, 6))
 Sandy River Gorge (Class 4)
 Sandy Gorge (Class 5 (6))
 Revenue Bridge to Dodge Park
 Dodge Park to Oxbow Park
 Oxbow to Columbia (Class 2)
 Siletz River North Fork (Class 3–4)
 Smith River
 Hole Gorge (Class 4)
 Lower South Fork Gorge (Class 4+)
 Upper South Fork Gorge (Class 5)
 South Santiam River
 Soda Fork (Class 5)
 Monster Section (Class 4 (6))
 Mountain House Section: (Class 5)
 South Umpqua River Three Falls Section (Class 3 (4-5))
 Umpqua River
 White River
 Lower (Class 3 (4))
 Upper (Class 3 - 4 (4))
 Celestial Gorge (Class 6)
 Wilson River, Devil's Lake Fork (Headwaters Run) (Class 4+)

Washington 

The most popular runs in Washington are listed below.

 Canyon Creek
 East Fork of the Lewis River
 Green River
 Icicle Creek
 Little White Salmon River
 Skookumchuck Narrows
 Skykomish River
 Snoqualmie River
 Washougal River
 Wenatchee River - Tumwater Canyon
 Wind River
 White Salmon River

Wyoming 

 Clarks Fork Yellowstone River
 Snake River
 Wind River

Oceania

Australia 
North Johnston River North, QLD
Tully River North, QLD
Barron River, Cairns
Penrith White water stadium, NSW
Nymboida River, Northern NSW
 Mitta Mitta River, Victoria
 Franklin River, Tasmania
 Avon River, Western Australia

New Zealand 
 Wairoa River (Bay of Plenty) (grade 2–5)
 Kaituna River
 Rangitata River
 Mohaka River (grade 2–5)

South America

Chile 
 Futaleufú River
 Trancura River near Pucón
 Baker River

Ecuador 
 Rio Napo (Napo River) Class 3
 Rio Misahualli (Misahualli River) Class 2

Peru 

 Chili River (near Arequipa)

References 

Whitewater rivers